Vladimir Semyonovich Golenishchev (29 January 1856 – 5 August 1947), formerly also known as Wladimir or Woldemar Golenischeff, was one of the first and most accomplished Russian Egyptologists.

Life
Golenishchev, the son of a well-to-do merchant, was educated at the Saint Petersburg University. In 1884–85 he organized and financed excavations in Wadi Hammamat, followed by the research at Tell el-Maskhuta in 1888–89. In the course of the following two decades he travelled to Egypt more than sixty times and brought back an enormous collection of more than 6,000 ancient Egyptian antiquities, including such priceless relics as the Moscow Mathematical Papyrus, the Story of Wenamun, the Alexandrian World Chronicle, and various Fayum portraits. He also published the so-called Hermitage papyri, including the Prophecy of Neferti, now stored in the Hermitage Museum. 

Having sold his collection to the Moscow Museum of Fine Arts in 1909, Golenishchev settled in Egypt. Following the Russian Revolution of 1917, he never returned to Russia, residing in Nice and Cairo. In Egypt, he established and held the chair in Egyptology at the University of Cairo from 1924 to 1929. He was also employed by the Egyptian Museum in Cairo, where he catalogued hieratic papyri. Golenishchev died in Nice aged 90.

Legacy
A memorial to famous egyptologists by the Egyptian Museum since 2006 features a bust of Vladimir Golenishchev. His papers are held at the Pushkin Museum, at the Centre Wladimir Golenischeff in Paris, France, and also in the Griffith Institute in Oxford, England.

See also
 Egyptian Collection of the Hermitage Museum
 Oscar Eduardovich Lemm
 Boris Turayev

References

External links
Centre Wl. Golenischeff, Paris
Bibliography of Vladimir Golenishchev

Golen
Golen
Academic staff of Cairo University
Golen
Golen